The 2021 Toyota U.S. Figure Skating Championships were held from January 11–21, 2021 at the Orleans Arena in Las Vegas, Nevada. Medals were awarded in the disciplines of men's singles, ladies' singles, pair skating, and ice dance at the senior and junior levels. The results were part of the U.S. selection criteria for the 2021 World Championships. It would also have been part of the selection criteria for the 2021 World Junior Championships and the 2021 Four Continents Championship, but the events were cancelled.

San Jose, which previously hosted the event in 1996, 2012, and 2018, was announced as the original host in October 2019. On November 9, 2020, U.S. Figure Skating announced that, in light of the COVID-19 pandemic in the United States, the event would be moved to Las Vegas, Nevada. After the success of 2020 Skate America's bubble environment in the same arena, USFSA implemented the same structure for the 2021 U.S. Championships. Las Vegas had never hosted the event prior to this year. San Jose was awarded the right to host the 2023 U.S. Championships.

No audience was allowed to be present at the event.

Qualifying 
U.S. Figure Skating announced a new qualifying structure, the U.S. Figure Skating Championship Series, to replace Regionals and Sectionals due to skaters' delayed training times resulting from the COVID-19 pandemic.

USFSA Championship Series 
The Championship Series consists of eight events held in November and December 2020. Skaters can select up to two competitions and will then be advanced to Nationals or the High Performance Development Team based on their highest score, rather than their placement. A list of the skaters who qualified for either will be made available on December 7.

On November 2, 2020, USFSA moved the Championship Series to a virtual format. The following changes occurred as a result of the shift:
 Senior and junior athletes registered for the Series and not previously qualified for the 2021 U.S. Championships were offered the opportunity to compete in a virtual qualifying competition for the remaining entry positions without needing to earn a minimum technical element score.
 Novice, intermediate and juvenile competitors registered for the Series were offered the opportunity to participate in high-level competitive program to identify the National High Performance Development Team. The program will offer a variety of virtual and in-person opportunities January through May, as conditions allow.

Schedule 
The Championship Series was scheduled to comprise the following competitions:

ISP Points Challenge 
Over the month of September, USFSA held the virtual ISP (International Selection Pool) Points Challenge to allow skaters to be judged by ISU-level judges. Skaters also competed for $200,000 in prize money. The competition was used to give senior skaters byes to Nationals and was used in the selection of future international assignments, as conditions allowed.

Senior medalists

Junior medalists

Advancement to Nationals 
Athletes and teams receiving a bye were required to register for the Championship Series. Although senior-level skaters were eligible to earn byes from the ISP Points Challenge, it did not award byes for junior-level skaters. Consideration for additional byes based on international-type events will be evaluated on a case-by-case basis. As of November 2, the Championships Series was replaced by a virtual qualifying competition, resulting in changes to the qualification structure.

On November 9, it was announced only Junior and Senior events were to be skated, with Juvenile, Intermediate, and Novice skaters in either the High Performance Development Camp or the International Selection Pool allowed to skate up. No Senior Ice Dance event would be held in the series due to a lack of entries. Only 12 Entries in the Junior Singles event would move forward to Nationals, along with 8 Junior Pairs and 10 Junior Ice Dance entries. Skaters already with byes were told not to enter, and they would receive more information. There will be no minimum score this year. Senior entries in the Singles events qualifying for Nationals remain the same - 9, but Pairs was lowered to 5.

The results will be posted by December 21. Video submissions to the series will be available on public format, including the US Figure Skating Fan Zone and Peacock Premium.

Seniors 
Singles skaters advanced to Nationals in the following ways:

 Placing in the Top 5 in the previous year's Nationals
 Top 4 scores from the ISP Points Challenge (excluding the top 5 byes)
 Top 9 scores from the Championship Series

Pairs teams advanced to Nationals in the following ways:

 Placing in the Top 5 in the previous year's Nationals
 Top 4 scores from the ISP Points Challenge (excluding the top 5 byes)
 Top 5 scores in the Championship Series (A sixth spot was opened after the split of Kayne/O'Shea.)

Ice dance teams advanced to Nationals in the following ways:

 Placing in the Top 5 in the previous year's Nationals
 Top 4 scores from the ISP Points Challenge (excluding the top 5 byes)
 Due to the number of entries, there was no senior ice dance event during the Championship Series.

There will be no alternates to the senior events.

Juniors 
Junior singles skaters advance to Nationals in the following ways:

 Top 12 scores in the Championship Series

Junior pairs skaters advance to Nationals in the following ways:

 Top 8 scores in the Championship Series

Junior ice dance skaters advance to Nationals in the following ways:

 Top 10 scores in the Championship Series.

The next two ranked skaters in each discipline will be alternates to the events.

Entries

Seniors 
U.S. Figure Skating published a list of entries on December 22, 2020. Skaters either earned a bye based on their placement at the 2020 U.S. Championships and/or the ISP Points Challenge or qualified through the Championships Series.

Juniors 
U.S. Figure Skating published a list of entries on December 22, 2020. Skaters qualified through the Championships Series.

Changes to preliminary entries

Schedule
Due to the bubble environment, the Orleans Arena will host all practices and competitions. Senior events will be held from January 12–17 and Junior events from January 19–21. Also due to the bubble environment, there are specific entry/leaving dates for each of the Senior disciplines, with all Junior-level skaters arriving on January 18.

Medal summary

Senior

Junior

Senior results

Senior men

Senior ladies

Senior pairs

Senior ice dance

Junior results

Junior men

Junior ladies

Junior pairs

Junior ice dance

Controversy 
U.S. Figure Skating maintained strict COVID-19 protocols within the bubble, including asking skaters to don a mask immediately after leaving the ice, but appeared to apply inconsistent requirements to skaters who had come into contact with positive cases prior to the event. After three senior pairs teams training under the same coach came into contact with a COVID-positive case, they voluntarily chose to withdraw out of precaution, whereas senior ice dance team Christina Carreira / Anthony Ponomarenko appeared to be asked to withdraw by the federation. However, Carreira/Ponomarenko's rinkmates and coaches were able to attend the competition, despite Carreira/Ponomarenko having come into contact with the positive case at their training rink. In addition, coach Tom Zakrajsek was unable to travel to the event due to contracting COVID-19 in early January and one of his students, Paige Rydberg, also tested positive upon arrival in Las Vegas; despite this, no contact tracing protocols were enacted, with the remaining athletes from Zakrajsek's training group and rink being allowed to compete.

International team selections

World Championships 
The World Championships are scheduled to be held from March 22–28 in Stockholm, Sweden. U.S. Figure Skating announced the ladies' team on January 16 and the men's, pairs, and ice dance teams on January 17.

Four Continents Championships 
The 2021 Four Continents Championships, originally scheduled to be held from February 9–14 in Sydney, Australia, were cancelled.

World Junior Championships 

The 2021 World Junior Championships were scheduled to be held from March 1–7 in Harbin, China, but were cancelled on November 24.

World Team Trophy 
The World Team Trophy is scheduled to be held from April 15–18 in Osaka, Japan.

References

External links 
 Official website 

2021
January 2021 sports events in the United States
2021 in American sports
2021 in figure skating
Sports competitions in the Las Vegas Valley